Jakov Xoxa (15 April 1923 – 11 November 1979) was an author from Albania of the 20th century.

Biography
Xoxa was of ethnic Aromanian origins. Xoxa was born in the town of Fier, Albania on April 15, 1923 and died on November 11, 1979. He studied at the Qemal Stafa High School, in Tirana, Albania. Although at a relatively young age, like many other Albanian intellectuals he participated in the Anti-Fascist War. After the Liberation of the country he continued his studies in philology and began writing poetry and prose. In 1949 he published his first prose novel. Beginning in 1957 he worked as a professor in the Faculty of History and Philology at the University of Tirana, where for many years he lectured on literary theory. He died in 1979 in Budapest. He is the grandfather of Ajola Xoxa, the wife of Tirana's mayor Erion Veliaj.

Notable Works
The Dead River, 1967.
The White Juga, 1967.
Flower of Salt, 1989.

See also
Albanian literature

References

External links 
 

1923 births
1979 deaths
20th-century Albanian writers
Qemal Stafa High School alumni
People from Fier
Albanian people of Aromanian descent